Parle Tilak Vidyalaya Association (also known as PTVA) is an educational institution in Vile Parle, Mumbai, India. It consists of five schools - the PTV English Medium School, the PTV Marathi Medium Secondary School, the PTV Marathi Medium Primary School, Paranjape Vidyalaya and the Parle Tilak School ICSE. It is also known for cricket team and participates in various sports. The school has completed 100 years in the year 2021.

History

The Marathi Medium School (then unified), was founded in 1921, as a tribute to Shri Lokmanya Bal Gangadhar Tilak. The English medium School was founded in 1982.
The ICSE medium school founded in 2008, was initially a part of the same building as the English medium school. In 2012, the ICSE medium was shifted to a newly constructed building. The schools (the English, Marathi, and ICSE medium) have produced merit list rankers in the State Secondary Board examinations and the ICSE examinations year after year. The Marathi medium school takes part in examinations like NTS, MTS, Olympiad and Homi Bhabha Young Scientist Examination.

List of institutions
 Parle Tilak Vidyalaya English Medium School 
 PTV Marathi Medium Secondary School
 PTV Marathi Medium Primary School 
 Paranjape Vidyalaya
 Parle Tilak Vidyalaya ICSE Board

Colleges and other institutions 
 Sathaye College (Parle College, established 1959)
Dahanukar College of commerce
 Parle Tilak Vidyalaya Institute of Management
 Mulund College of Commerce

References

External links
 Parle Tilak Vidyalaya Institute of Management, Official website

Schools in Mumbai
Educational organisations in Maharashtra
Memorials to Bal Gangadhar Tilak
Educational institutions established in 1921
1921 establishments in India